The Ministry of Communications and Information Technology (abbreviated  MCIT) was the government agency of Myanmar. The ministry administered communications, postal services, and information technology.

In November 2012, the name was changed from the Ministry of Communications, Posts and Telegraphs (MCPT) to the MCIT with the cabinet reshuffle under Thein Sein's administration. 

After that, with the reorganization of ministries in March 2016, the MCIT merged with the Ministry of Transport and the Ministry of Rail Transportation to become the Ministry of Transport and Communications (MOTC).

See also
 Economy of Myanmar
 Cabinet of Myanmar

References

External links
 Official website

Communications
Myanmar
Myanmar
Communications in Myanmar